Mario Impemba (born ) is an American sportscaster, best known as the television play-by-play announcer for the Detroit Tigers from 2002 to 2018. Before working for the Tigers, he announced for the Los Angeles Angels on both television and radio and several minor league teams.

Early and personal life
Impemba is a native of Sterling Heights, Michigan and a graduate of Stevenson High School and Michigan State University. He and his wife Cathy are parents of two sons, Brett and Daniel. Brett was drafted in the 49th round of the 2011 Major League Baseball Draft by the Detroit Tigers. The Impembas live in Macomb County, Michigan.

Broadcasting career

Early roles

At Michigan State University, Impemba volunteered to announce whatever games were being broadcast on the university sports network. As a professional, he started out announcing games for the Peoria Chiefs single-A baseball club in 1987. Impemba also served as the sports director at WXCL Radio and the play-by-play voice of the Peoria Rivermen of the now-defunct International Hockey League during the 1987-88 season. From 1989 to 1990, Mario served as the voice of the Quad City Angels single-A team in Davenport, Iowa.  In 1991, Impemba began calling games for the Tucson Toros of the Pacific Coast League.

Impemba served as the radio (KLAA) and fill-in television (Fox Sports West and KCOP-TV) play-by-play voice of the Los Angeles Angels for seven seasons (1995–2001).

Detroit Tigers
Beginning in 2002, Impemba joined the Tigers television team alongside color commentator Kirk Gibson, replacing play-by-play commentator Josh Lewin. In 2003, Rod Allen replaced Gibson, who was named the Tigers' bench coach that season. The Impemba–Allen tandem would last from 2003 to 2018. In the last few years of his tenure, Impemba occasionally worked alongside Gibson and Jack Morris.

On September 4, 2018, Impemba and Allen were involved in an off-air physical altercation immediately after broadcasting the Tigers' road game against the Chicago White Sox. Fox Sports Detroit sent the men home on different planes after the game, and the following night's telecast was covered by Matt Shepard and Kirk Gibson. While one source claimed that there was an argument over a chair, followed by Allen putting Impemba in a choke hold, Allen's agent denied that his client choked Impemba. On September 7, Fox Sports Detroit suspended both men from calling any Tigers games for the remainder of the 2018 season. It was later announced that Impemba and Allen's contracts were not renewed for future seasons, ending their 16-year partnership.

Boston Red Sox
On February 13, 2019, Impemba was named as a part-time play-by-play announcer for the Boston Red Sox Radio Network. It was announced in January 2020 that he would not return to the Red Sox.

Mannerism and notable calls

Impemba always announces the game's attendance when there is one out left in the game, and usually rounds down, for example "Bottom of the ninth, two outs, the Tigers are about to win in front of a crowd of better than 41,000 fans—41,212 to be exact." Impemba is also known for calling any catch in which the outfielder holds the glove with palm up a "basket catch." His most common home run call is, "to the track, to the wall, gone!" Impemba, along with Rod Allen, called Armando Galarraga's near-perfect game on June 2, 2010. After Jim Joyce mistakenly called the runner safe at first base on what would have been the final out (Galarraga would retire the next Indians batter to end the game), Impemba stated that he "never felt this disappointed after a Tigers victory."

Awards and other works

Impemba had a Tigers blog named "Last Call," hosted on his now-defunct website, marioimpemba.com. His book, If These Walls Could Talk: Detroit Tigers, was published in 2014.

Impemba won a Michigan Emmy Award in June 2006 in the sports play-by-play category, and also won the 2014 DSBA Ty Tyson Award for Excellence in Sports Broadcasting, receiving the award in a special pre-game on-field ceremony at Comerica Park.

References

External links

Mario Impemba on Facebook
So you want to be a broadcaster - Take a behind the scenes look on game day with Mario and Rod of FS Detroit

Living people
American people of Italian descent
American television sports announcers
Anaheim Angels announcers
Boston Red Sox announcers
College basketball announcers in the United States
College hockey announcers in the United States
Detroit Tigers announcers
High school basketball announcers in the United States
High school football announcers in the United States
Major League Baseball broadcasters
Michigan State University alumni
People from Sterling Heights, Michigan
Year of birth missing (living people)